Jim Leisy, Jr., was an artist, photographer, book editor and publisher.

He was born in Dallas, Texas in 1950. He attended both Bethel College and Stanford University, and earned a BA (history major/art minor) from Bethel College. He was editor of the Bethel Collegian.

In 1972 he joined the University of Chicago Press as a photographer. He also worked as a freelance photographer and art editor for the Chicago Review. After two years he left University of Chicago Press to become a field representative and field editor for Addison-Wesley Publishing Company, based in Philadelphia. In 1977, he was hired to acquire and edit college textbooks in the fields of chemistry and computer science for Brooks/Cole Publishing Company (Monterey CA). In 1978, the company was acquired by Thomson International. He rose through the executive ranks at Thomson and became a vice-president of a company that specialized in publishing for information technology.

In 1985, he left The Thomson Corporation to found Franklin, Beedle & Associates Incorporated to publish college-level textbooks in the fields of computer science and information technology.

Through Franklin, Beedle & Associates he has edited and published numerous textbooks that have become de facto standards, which include: Carolyn Gillay's (Saddleback College) over 20 books on Microsoft DOS and Windows; Ernest Ackermann and Karen Hartman's(University of Mary Washington/USA State Department) textbooks on the use of the Internet; John Zelle's (Wartburg College) Python-based computer science 1 textbook; Paul Brians' (Washington State University) Common Errors in English Usage; and Mark Liberman (University of Pennsylvania) and Geoffrey Pullum's (UC Santa Cruz) Far from the Madding Gerund. Publications from his companies have earned numerous achievement awards and have been featured on Air America Radio, NPR, The Progressive, The New York Times, CNN, MSNBC, and nearly all major US newspapers.

He was active in fields of publishing and photography through his companies: Franklin, Beedle & Associates, Inc., William, James & Company and Digitopia. In addition he was a member of the board of directors for the Portland Art Museum Photography Council. He was also staff photographer for Chamber Music Northwest (Executive Director is Linda Magee and Artistic Director is David Shifrin) which has strong ties with the Chamber Music Society of Lincoln Center. His photographs have been published by The Oregonian, NPR, Poetry Review, Diffusion annual, and The Oregon Cultural Trust, and are in private collections and museums.

External links 
Franklin, Beedle & Associates website
William, James & Company website
Jim's photography website
Chamber Music Northwest website

Leisy
Living people
American photographers
American publishers (people)